The Foscari were an ancient Venetian patrician family.

Foscari may also refer to:

People 
 Francesco Foscari (1373–1457), the 65th Doge of the Republic of Venice
 Girolamo Foscari (1505–1563), Roman Catholic Bishop of Torcello 
 Guarino Foscari, Saint (c. 1080- 1158), Italian Roman Catholic Augustinian canon regular and also Cardinal-Bishop of Palestrina 
 Paolo Foscari (died 1393/4), Venetian noble, Bishop of Castello, and later Latin Archbishop of Patras
 Pietro Foscari (died 1485), Italian Roman Catholic cardinal

Buildings 
 Palazzo Foscari (disambiguation)
 Villa Foscari, a patrician villa in Mira, near Venice
 Villa Widmann – Foscari, an 18th-century villa located in Mira, owned by the families of Sceriman, Donà, Foscari

See also
 I due Foscari, an opera by Giuseppe Verdi